Silvestru River may refer to:
 Silvestru, a tributary of the Băncușor in Suceava County, Romania
 Silvestru, a tributary of the Horăița in Neamț County, Romania